The Smith–Lyon Farmhouse is a historic farm at 400 N. Woodstock Road in Southbridge, Massachusetts.  It is an unusual example of a well-preserved rural Greek Revival house in Southbridge.  It is a -story wood-frame house.  The gable-end front facade features full-length sidelights around the door, pilastered corner trim, a pedimented gable, and a full-width porch with Doric columns.  It is reported by have been built c. 1850 by Luther Smith, a mule dealer.  By 1878 the farm was owned by Lucius Lyon.

The house was listed on the National Register of Historic Places in 1989.

See also
National Register of Historic Places listings in Southbridge, Massachusetts
National Register of Historic Places listings in Worcester County, Massachusetts

References

Houses completed in 1850
Houses in Southbridge, Massachusetts
National Register of Historic Places in Southbridge, Massachusetts
Houses on the National Register of Historic Places in Worcester County, Massachusetts